The 1982 United States Senate election in Ohio took place on November 2, 1982. Incumbent Democratic U.S. Senator Howard Metzenbaum was re-elected to a second term in office, defeating Republican State Senator Paul Pfeifer. Along with the gubernatorial election that same year, this election is the last time Butler County voted Democratic in a statewide election.

Democratic primary

Candidates
 Norbert G. Dennerll, former Cleveland City Councilman
 Howard Metzenbaum, incumbent Senator

Results

Republican primary

Candidates
 John Ashbrook, U.S. Representative from Newark (died April 24)
 Walter E. Beckjord
 Richard H. Englefield (write-in)
 Paul Pfeifer, State Senator from Bucyrus
 Bill Ress, State Senator from New Philadelphia (write-in)

Campaign
Most polls showed U.S. Representative John Ashbrook winning the primary with a plurality, but he died on April 24 from a gastric hemorrhage. 

Ashbrook supporter and State Senator Bill Ress launched a write-in campaign with the endorsement of Jean Spencer Ashbrook, the Representative's widow.

Results

General election

Results

See also 
 1982 United States Senate elections

References

1982
Ohio
United States Senate